Phreatia listeri, commonly known as the Christmas Island caterpillar orchid, is a plant in the orchid family and is an epiphyte with four to six flat, blunt leaves in a fan-like arrangement. A large number of tiny, greenish white flowers are arranged along a thin flowering stem. It is endemic to Christmas Island.

Description
Flowering occurs between September and October.

Taxonomy and naming
Phreatia listeri was first formally described in 1890 by Robert Allen Rolfe who published the description in the Journal of the Linnean Society, Botany. The specific epithet (listeri) honours Joseph Jackson Lister who, with John Maclear and the officers of H.M.S. Egeria collected the type specimen.

Distribution and habitat
Found only on Christmas Island, the orchid is common on rainforest trees.

References

listeri
Endemic flora of Christmas Island
Plants described in 1890
Endemic orchids of Australia
Taxa named by Robert Allen Rolfe